The Lions' Den is an independentist armed Palestinian group operating in the Israeli-occupied West Bank. The group emerged in August 2022, a year of increased in shooting and stabbing attacks on Israeli civilians and soldiers, and takes is moniker from Ibrahim al-Nabulsi, a prominent militant from Nablus, nicknamed The Lion of Nablus, killed in July during an Israeli raid.   It comprises members of other Palestinian militant organizations, traditionally opposed by Fatah, including Hamas and Palestinian Islamic Jihad, and disafffected or younger members of Fatah.  is reportedly based in the Old City of Nablus.

The organization was founded by a 25-year-old Palestinian named Mohammed al-Azizi, more commonly known as "Abu Saleh", and his friend Abdel Rahman Suboh, or "Abu Adam", 28 years old. They were both killed in fighting in July 2022. The group has experienced a rise in popularity among Palestinians in the West Bank, regularly sharing videos of their attacks on TikTok and Telegram. Their TikTok account was suspended in October 2022, leading the group to publish the rest of their videos to their Telegram account, which holds 238,000 subscribers as of 24 February 2023.

Background

2022 is the deadliest in the West Bank for Palestinians since 2015, mostly focused on Nablus and Jenin. 
there has been a notable rise in violence by extremist Jewish settlers. Following the killing of an Israeli soldier on 11 October 2022, for which the Lions' Den claimed responsibility, Nablus is under a tight siege which Palestinians protest as collective punishment.

Timeline

Spring 2022

Summer 2022

Fall 2022
 August – The first mention of the group was made by Palestinian media on 15 August. The group claimed responsibility for an attack on IDF soldiers in Rujeib, West Bank.
 2 September – The group held its first rally in Nablus, honouring two Palestinian Islamic Jihad members who had been killed in July.
 9 September – Israeli police said that they had foiled a plan by the group to carry out a large-scale attack in southern Tel Aviv, and arrested a suspect trying to enter the city carrying two pipe bombs and a submachine gun.
 19 September – An Izz ad-Din al-Qassam Brigades commander, Musaba Shtayyeh, was arrested by Palestinian Authority servicemen in Nablus resulting in clashes between hundreds of militants and security forces, resulting in one civilian being shot and killed by the PA force. Palestinian security forces said that they had discovered Shtayyeh was also a member of the Lions' Den.
 22 September – Bullets are fired at the Israeli settlement of Har Bracha and a nearby military post. The IDF said they found 60 shell casings nearby. The Lions' Den claimed responsibility.
 25 September – A Lions' Den member was killed in an IDF ambush.
 2 October – A taxi and bus were shot at by militants near Elon Moreh in the West Bank, injuring the taxi driver. A demonstration by local Israeli settlers to protest the incident was attacked with gunfire, wounding a soldier. The Lions' Den claimed responsibility for the incidents.
 Bullets are fired at Israeli troops near Itamar and Beita, but nobody was harmed.
 5 October – An IDF raid to find the suspects of the 2 October attacks arrested a member of the group and resulted in one militant being killed.
 11 October – Israeli settlers held a demonstration in Jerusalem to protest the recent attacks. A 21-year-old Israeli soldier who had been assigned to defend the group was shot and killed. The Lions' Den claimed responsibility.
 16 October – flag photo.
 According to the Jerusalem Post, Hebrew media reported that Prime Minister Yair Lapid, alternate prime minister Naftali Bennett and Defense Minister Benny Gantz along with the heads of Israel's Mossad and Shin Bet, met to discuss the group and the recent escalations in the West Bank.
 18 October – Suhaib Shtayyeh, Musaba Shtayyeh's younger brother, was identified as a member of the group and arrested by the IDF.
 23 October – Tamer al-Kilani, a founding member of the Lions' Den, was killed by a bomb planted on a motorcycle in Nablus, in the occupied West Bank.
 25 October – Israeli soldiers raided an apartment in Nablus used by the group as an headquarter. Three Lions' Den militants were killed, including leader and co-founder Wadee al-Houh. Two Palestinian civilians were also killed in the nearby areas. Protests erupted in the town of Nabi Saleh hours after the raid, resulting in a Palestinian man being killed by Israeli soldiers.

2023
 22 February – Israeli soldiers conducted a military incursion into the Palestinian city of Nablus. The initial targets were Lions' Den members Husam Bassam Isleem (24) and Muhammad Omar “Juneidi” Abu Bakr (23), who were shot and killed. Five other group members were also killed during firefight in the city. Four Palestinian civilians, including three elderly men and a boy, were also killed by the Israeli soldiers.

See also
 Timeline of the Israeli–Palestinian conflict in 2022
 Jenin Brigades

References

Military units and formations established in 2022
2022 establishments in Asia
Palestinian militant groups